Seoul International Fireworks Festival (Korean: 서울세계불꽃축제) is an event which shows fireworks in Seoul by Hanwha company. Different countries participate in this event every year. In 2013, Canada, Japan, France and South Korea worked together. This event was held in 2000 first. It starts at Hangang Park in the evening in October. However, festival was cancelled on 2001, 2006, and 2009. 
 From many countries, there are diverse kinds of fireworks in South Korea. After the festival, it holds a commemorative photo exhibition in the observatory of the 63 building through a fireworks picture contest exhibit.

Introduction 
About 100,000 fireworks went off, and more than a million of viewers visited every year. Seoul International Fireworks Festival is the typical festival in Korea. There are about 20,000 visitors at main event hall at Yeoido. Moreover, there are about 100,000 visitors near Wonhyo Bridge, Hangang Bridge, Hangang Park Ichon Area and more places. In total, about 120,000 visitors enjoyed the festival.

Generally, each team who participated in Seoul international fireworks festival costs about 200 million won. Including the incidental expense, group Hanhwa spent about more than 1.5 billion won.

Attraction 
The main event hall that located in front of the 63 Building is the best place for enjoying the festival. You also can enjoy the sound tracks. However, it will be extremely crowded. Besides, Hangang Park Ichon Area which is located northern extremity end of Hangang and Nodeul Island which is located at the central Hangang Bridge are chosen for great view. However, it is impossible to listen with the sound tracks which is from the main event hall. It is recommended only for taking pictures or avoiding extremely crowded. If you want to avoid crowded or you are with lovers or family, you can get the official tickets from the fireworks event which is proceeding from Hanhwa.

Location 
The closest subway station is line 5 Yeouinaru Station. However, the station will be extremely crowded. Therefore, visitors recommended for get off at line 5 Yeouido Station, line 9 Saetgang Station, or line 1 Daebang Station and walk. If visitors want to enjoy the Seoul international fireworks festival at Hangang Park Ichon Area, it is better to get off at line 1 Yongsan Station, line 4 Sinyongsan Station, or Ichon Station. Many visitors enjoy the festival at the opposite side of the main event hall, the Hangang Park Ichon Area. The festival will be crowded with people before it start about 3 hours ago, visitors need to go early to choose the best place to sit.

Criticism 
Seoul International Fireworks Festival is held from a private institution, Hanhwa, although there are many festivals that are held from the public institution like Busan International Fireworks Festival and Pohang International Lights Festival. In 2005, the then mayor of Seoul, Lee Myung-bak, said "It is a really big problem that Seoul City's budget and event progressing are supporting to the event from only a private institution" and he did not attend the opening ceremony of the Seoul International Fireworks Festival that are attended by convention. There are many opinions that it should move the event place to another one or abolish the festival because its purpose for the event is corporate communications and it induces traffic jams in the center of a city and trash problem.

See also 
 Busan International Fireworks Festival - Asia's biggest fireworks festival

References

See also
List of festivals in South Korea
List of festivals in Asia

External links

 Seoul International Fireworks Festival official website, Color Your Life

Festivals in Seoul
Yeouido
Hanwha
Annual events in South Korea
2000 establishments in South Korea
Recurring events established in 2000
Fireworks events in Asia
Festivals established in 2000